Koni De Winter (born 12 June 2002) is a Belgian professional footballer who plays as defender and midfielder for  club Empoli, on loan from Juventus.

Career

Early career 
De Winter played in City Pirates Antwerp until 2015. He played the 2015–16 season in the Lierse SK Youth Sector. The following season, De Winter moved to the Zulte Waregem. In the summer of 2018, De Winter moved to Juventus, becoming the first Belgian footballer ever to play for them. In the 2018–19 season, De Winter made 27 appearances and scored one goal with the under-17s. In the 2019–20 season, De Winter made 8 appearances with the under-19s team. The following season, De Winter made 23 appearances with the under-19s often playing as captain.

Juventus

First call-up by Juventus and 2021–22 season 
On 28 October 2020, De Winter was called up by Juventus' first team coach Andrea Pirlo for a UEFA Champions League match against Barcelona. On 20 February 2021, he renewed his contract until 2024. On 24 July, De Winter made his unofficial debut for Juventus in a 3–1 win against Cesena; scoring the opening goal in the 4th minute.

De Winter made his debut for Juventus U23 – the reserve team of Juventus –  on 22 August 2021 in a 3–2 win against Pro Sesto in the Coppa Italia Serie C. On 20 October, De Winter was sent-off in a 2–2 draw against AlbinoLeffe, ten minutes after his entry onto the field. On 27 October, De Winter scored his first career goal: an equalizing goal in a 1–1 draw against Piacenza.

On 23 November, De Winter made his official debut with the first team as well as his debut in the Champions League in a 4–0  defeat against Chelsea coming on as substitute of Juan Cuadrado in the 81st minute.

On 29 January 2022, he had a luxation of his left shoulder during a match against Feralpisalò. On 6 March, De Winter returned from his injury in a 1–0 win against Pro Sesto coming on as a substitute the 85th minute; four minutes later, De Winter scored the winning goal. After the end of the season, on 9 July, the defender officially renewed his contract with the club until 2026.

Loan to Empoli 
On 9 July 2022, the same day as his contract extension with Juventus was announced, De Winter was sent on loan to fellow Serie A side Empoli, with the deal being made official by both teams the following day.

Style of play 
A pretty versatile player, De Winter can play as a central defender, a full-back on both sides, a defensive midfielder or even as a mezzala.

Personal life 
De Winter was born in Belgium to a Belgian father and Congolese mother.

Career statistics

Club

International

Honours 
Juventus
 Supercoppa Italiana runner-up: 2021

References

External links 
 
 

2002 births
Living people
Footballers from Antwerp
Belgian footballers
Belgium youth international footballers
Belgian sportspeople of Democratic Republic of the Congo descent
Association football fullbacks
Association football midfielders
Lierse S.K. players
S.V. Zulte Waregem players
Juventus F.C. players
Juventus Next Gen players
Empoli F.C. players
Serie C players

Belgian expatriate footballers
Belgian expatriate sportspeople in Italy
Expatriate footballers in Italy